Emanuele Di Zenzo (born 26 December 1979) is a Swiss football midfielder who most recently played for AC Bellinzona in the Swiss Super League.

Career 
He suffered a serious injury which forced him to play only for FC Sion's reserve team during the 2007-08 season; subsequently he moved to newly promoted AC Bellinzona, where he made his first Super League appearance in over a year. He left the team in winter 2008.

Honours 
Sion
Swiss Cup: 2005–06

References

1979 births
Living people
Swiss men's footballers
FC Sion players
Servette FC players
FC Locarno players
SR Delémont players
AC Bellinzona players
Association football midfielders